Dolne Maliki  is a village in the administrative district of Gmina Stara Kiszewa, within Kościerzyna County, Pomeranian Voivodeship, in northern Poland. It is located within the historic region of Pomerania.

The village has a population of 153.

Maliki was a royal village of the Polish Crown, administratively located in the Tczew County in the Pomeranian Voivodeship. Maliki is now divided into two villages: Dolne Maliki ("Lower Maliki") and Górne Maliki ("Upper Maliki").

References

Dolne Maliki